Rosea Kemp (c. 1941 – 27 December 2015) was a BBC radio weather forecaster, who later worked in Australia, at the Bureau of Meteorology.

She appeared as a castaway on the BBC Radio programme Desert Island Discs on 25 December 1968.

References

External links 
 Ickenham Miniature Railway history with photo of Kemp opening the railway
 

1940s births
2015 deaths
Place of birth missing
BBC people
Australian meteorologists